Veterans Memorial Field is a stadium in Altoona, Pennsylvania.  It is primarily used for baseball and was the home of Altoona Rail Kings.  The ballpark has a capacity of 3,000.

Sports venues in Pennsylvania
Minor league baseball venues
Buildings and structures in Altoona, Pennsylvania